VLOC may refer to:

In transportation:
Very large ore carrier 
VOR/Localizer, used in aviation navigation; for VOR, see VHF Omni-directional Radio Range